Moses Cohen Belinfante (24 September 1761 – 29 June 1827) was a Dutch journalist, translator, and schoolbook writer.

Biography
Moses Cohen Belinfante was born in The Hague in 1761, the descendent of Sephardic Jews who fled Portugal during the reign of John III in 1526. His father Saddik, a cousin of Isaac Cohen Belinfante, was Chief Rabbi of the Portuguese community in Amsterdam. When he was fourteen, Belinfante was sent to Copenhagen to study medicine under his great-uncle Salomo Theophilus de Meza, but remained there only a year. He married Angela Sarah Monteira in May 1784, with whom he had three children, none of whom lived past the age of eight.

Belinfante succeeded his father as principal of the Portuguese Jewish community school after the latter's death in 1786, a position he held until his dismissal in 1795. With his brother Jacob, he founded the bookshop and publishing house Belinfante and Company in 1802. He started in 1806 the first Dutch Jewish paper, devoted especially to the interests of the Jewish community of Amsterdam. This paper was, however, discontinued in 1808.

Belinfante was a strong advocate for Jewish emancipation in the Netherlands.

Publications
  Portuguese Jewish prayer books, translated into Dutch in collaboration with T. Saruco.
  Textbook for children.
 
 
 
 
  A translation from Hebrew into Dutch of Shalom Cohen's Hebrew catechism Shorashe Emunah.
 
 
  A Hebrew reader, recast from 's German work, with a Dutch translation and additions.

References
 

1761 births
1827 deaths
18th-century Dutch educators
19th-century Dutch journalists
Dutch booksellers
Dutch newspaper publishers (people)
Dutch Sephardi Jews
Dutch translators
Jewish activists
Jewish Dutch writers
Jewish educators
School principals and headteachers
Textbook writers
Translators from Hebrew
Translators to Dutch
Writers from The Hague